David T. Provost is a Detroit businessman and the Chairman of TCF Bank.

Education 
Provost earned his Bachelor of Arts degree from Alma College and his MBA from Eastern Michigan University, and graduated from the University of Wisconsin School of Banking. David also received two honorary doctorates, a Doctor of Letters from Alma College and a Doctor of Business from Eastern Michigan University. He is married with two children.

Career 
David T. Provost is the Chairman of TCF Bank.

Prior to joining the bank in 2017, Provost served as President and CEO of Talmer Bancorp, and chairman, and CEO of Talmer Bank and Trust, a Michigan based community bank.

Prior to joining Talmer Bank and Trust (formerly First Michigan Bank) in 2008, Provost served as chairman and CEO of The PrivateBank (formerly The Bank of Bloomfield Hills), which he co-founded in 1989. He also served at Manufacturers National Bank of Detroit, now known as Comerica Bank, for thirteen years.

David Provost serves on the board of directors and as Chairman of the Audit Committee for Plastipak Packaging, Inc., located in Plymouth, Michigan. As an active member of the community, he serves on the board of directors for The RESTORE Foundation, the Community Foundation of Southeastern Michigan, the Detroit Economic Club, Eastern Michigan University College of Business, the Partners in Torah Advisory Board, the Presbyterian Village Advisory Board, and is a Past chairman of the board of Trustees of Alma College.

David T Provost was named one of Crain's Detroit Business 2010 Newsmakers of the Year. In 2006 and 2015 he was awarded the Ernst and Young Entrepreneur of the Year in the Central Great Lakes Financial Services division. He also received the 2007 Yeshiva Beth Yehudah Outstanding Leadership Award, and is a recipient of Crain's Detroit Business "40 Under 40" business leaders award.

References 

American bankers
Economy of Detroit
Living people
Year of birth missing (living people)
Businesspeople from Detroit
Eastern Michigan University alumni
University of Wisconsin–Madison alumni